is a Japanese children's novel series written by Hiroshi Ishizaki and illustrated by Kaori Fujita. The series was launched on Kodansha's Aoi Tori Bunko imprint between July 2005 and February 2012, releasing 15 volumes during its run. An anime television adaptation by Shin-Ei Animation was broadcast in Japan from April 4, 2012 to February 19, 2014.

Plot
Whilst attempting to read her friends' love horoscopes, Chiyoko 'Choco' Kurotori attempts to summon the messenger of love, Cupid. However, due to having a stuffed nose at the time, she mispronounces the name and inadvertently summons a black witch named Gyubid instead. As such, Gyubid decides to train Chiyoko to become a black witch herself, learning various magic spells whilst facing off against various occult mysteries.

Characters

A fifth grade schoolgirl who is nicknamed  due to the similarities with her name. She is trained by Gyubid to become a black witch after accidentally summoning her while trying to summon Cupid with a stuffy nose. Whenever she is involved with something pertaining to the occult, she is often required to wear a loli gothic outfit.

A beautiful but rather mischievous black witch who was inadvertently summoned by Choco and decides to train her to become a black witch.

A former junior student at the Black Witch Public Academy and Gyubid's underclassman by two years.

A former student of Angolmois and Choco's rival. His magic was sealed by Angolmois (a stuff animal puppet), but there are times the seal falls off.

Chiyoko's friend since kindergarten.

Chiyoko's classmate and class representative.

A girl who loves cats.

Chiyoko's classmate whose perverted tendencies have earnt him the nickname .

A former classmate of Gyubid's in Black Witch Public Academy and her boss.
     

Chiyoko's grandma. Her real name is Thika. She knows her granddaughter is a black witch, but doesn't tell her so she isn't intruding her secret. Thika is very knowledgeable about things related to the Spirit World and tends to help Choco without her noticing. It was revealed later that she used to be a student of the Black Witch Public Academy and was friends with Melusine and Gyubid's grandma's old sister, Gyubad. She was expelled because she broke one of the school's rules.

Media

Novels
The original novel series written by Hiroshi Ishizaki and illustrated by Kaori Fujita was released on Kodansha's Aoi Tori Denki imprint between July 2004 and February 2012. Released over 15 volumes, the series has managed to sell over 2.6 million copies.

Anime

An anime television adaptation by Shin-Ei Animation has been produced for NHK Educational TV. The first season aired between April 4, 2012 and July 11, 2012, with the second season aired between from September 13, 2012 and February 19, 2014.

References

External links

Official anime website 

2005 children's books
2005 fantasy novels
2005 novels
2012 anime television series debuts
2014 Japanese television series endings
Japanese children's novels
Japanese fantasy novels
Kodansha books
Magical girl anime and manga
NHK original programming
Shin-Ei Animation
Television shows based on Japanese novels